Dayvon Ross (born March 17, 1991) is an American football player, who played wide receiver for the Tennessee Titans of the National Football League (NFL). He was listed at 6 ft 2ins and 215 lbs in college and at  6 ft 1in and 235 lbs in 2015. He has been timed at 4.41 in the forty-yard dash and has jumped 36.5” vertical. Born in Los Angeles, California, Ross started his football career at Manual Arts High School. After graduation, he played college football at Central State University in Wilberforce, Ohio, during his junior and senior years.

Early years
Ross grew up in South Los Angeles with nine siblings, and played football at Manual Arts High School.

College years
Originally a commitment of Rick Neuheisel's UCLA Bruins, Ross had missed required courses and was ruled ineligible by the NCAA. After briefly attending Los Angeles Southwest College and East Los Angeles College, he was accepted by the University of Virginia but again ruled ineligible by the NCAA. He finally transferred to Central State, where he played twice in his junior year and in his senior year he had 8 touchdowns and 60 passes for 926 yards.

NFL
In 2014, Ross was signed to the practice squad with the Seattle Seahawks, but was released after an injury. In March 2015, the Washington Redskins waived him, planning to develop him as a hybrid wide receiver–tight end.

References

Washington Redskins players
American football wide receivers
Central State University alumni
People from Los Angeles
1991 births
Living people